The Pentax 645D is a medium format digital SLR camera announced by Pentax on March 10, 2010.

Unlike other medium-format DSLRs, which accept digital camera backs of different resolutions or even manufacturers, the 645D has a fixed-back design similar to smaller full-frame and APS-C DSLRs. The fixed back allows the 645D to be fully weather-sealed.

Awards 
The 645D was awarded the Camera of the Year award at the Camera Grand Prix Japan 2011. Pentax celebrated this with the release of a limited edition of the camera.

References
http://www.dpreview.com/products/pentax/slrs/pentax_645d/specifications

645D
Cameras introduced in 2010